[e] is the sixth official album released in September 2009 and the third major album release of that year by Korean hip-hop group Epik High. The two other albums released in 2009 are Map the Soul and Remixing the Human Soul, an electronica-inspired remix compilation album with labelmates Planet Shiver. Like Map the Soul before it, [e] includes a complimentary mini-book along with the actual audio CDs. The 74 page mini-book contains song lyrics, interviews, photographs, and various production notes from the artists themselves.

[e] contains two discs of Hip hop musical experimentation in various genres. Genres experimented include electro-hop, dance-pop, classical music, acoustic rock, and traditional Korean trot music. The album's themes are divided separately into two discs. Disc 1, entitled [e]motion, contains tracks dealing with personal themes and is relatively less mainstream friendly compared to the second disc. Disc 2, conversely entitled [e]nergy, contains radio-friendly tracks, such as the lead single "따라해(Wannabe)(ft. Mellow)."

Notable guest artists on this release include frequent collaborator and Map the Soul labelmate MYK, Korean American emcee Kero One, battle rapper Dumbfoundead, Rakka (from Dilated Peoples), underground rap prodigy Dok2, and electronica group Planet Shiver.

Track listing

DISC 1 : [e]motion

DISC 2 : [e]nergy

References

External links
  Epik High's Official Site

2009 albums
Epik High albums
Korean-language albums